Green Mountain Roller Derby (GMRD) is a women's flat track roller derby league based in Burlington, Vermont. Founded in 2007, Green Mountain is a member of the Women's Flat Track Derby Association (WFTDA).

History
Green Mountain had their first home bout in February 2009, were accepted into the Women's Flat Track Derby Association Apprentice Program in September 2009, and gained full membership of the WFTDA the following September.

By 2010, the league had around 30 skaters. It remained Vermont's only women's flat track roller derby league, and attracted sell-out crowds of around 1,500 people to its bouts.

In September 2012, Green Mountain co-hosted (with Montreal Roller Derby) the WFTDA Eastern Regional Tournament in Essex Junction, Vermont, with the Gotham Girls Roller Derby All-Stars of New York City being the winning team.

Originally formed as Green Mountain Derby Dames, in May 2015 the league changed its name to Green Mountain Roller Derby, dropping the gender-specific “Dames” from its moniker. It has two teams, which compete against teams from other leagues.

WFTDA rankings

References

Roller derby leagues established in 2007
Roller derby leagues in Vermont
Sports in Burlington, Vermont
2007 establishments in Vermont